Allan Ranada is a Filipino professional boxer.

Three times Ranada has fought for regional titles, but has lost in all three attempts.  The titles include the WBC Asian Boxing Council flyweight title, the Pan Asian Boxing Association flyweight title, and the WBO Asia Pacific super flyweight title.

Ranada has also fought and lost to Johnriel Casimero, Sonny Boy Jaro, and Dennis Tubieron.

References 

1970 births
Living people
Filipino male boxers
Flyweight boxers